Tawasa is an extinct Native American language. Ostensibly the language of the Tawasa people of what is now Alabama, it is known exclusively through a word list attributed to a Tawasa named Lamhatty, collected in 1707.

John Swanton studied the Lamhatty word list and identified the language as a Timucuan dialect, suggesting it was intermediary between Timucua and Muskogean. This opinion has been the subject of significant scholarly debate, with some such as Julian Granberry considering it a dialect of Timucua, others arguing it was a distinct language in the Timucua family, and yet others such as John Hann doubting that Lamhatty was a Tawasa at all. The language shows significant Alabama influence, including the Muskogean same-subject suffix -t.

Evidence 
In 1707 an Indian named Lamhatty arrived in the British colony of Virginia, eventually arriving at the estate of Colonel John Walker. Taking an interest in him, Walker introduced him to colonial historian Robert Beverley. Through an interpreter, Lamhatty explained that he was from the village of Tawasa near the Gulf of Mexico. He had been captured and enslaved by the Tuscarora, who transported him eastward and sold him to the Savannah people. He escaped and traveled north to Virginia. Walker recorded the 60-word lexicon he learned from Lamhatty on the back of a letter, while Beverley wrote an account of Lamhatty's story. According to Beverley, Walker began treating Lamhatty like a slave once he learned other Tawasa were enslaved. Lamhatty escaped and went into the woods, never to be heard from again.

There has been scholarly debate about the place of Tawasa among languages. Studying the word list in the early 20th century, John Swanton noted the similarity with the Timucua language, and suggested Tawasa was an intermediary with Muskogean. Linguist Julian Granberry identifies it as a dialect of Timucua.  Others, such as John Hann, are skeptical of the accuracy of Beverley's account. He questions whether Lamhatty was a Tawasa at all.

Vocabulary 
Tawasa words are a bit difficult to make out, due to English respellings. For example, oo, ou corresponds to Timucua u, ough to o, eu to yu, and often e, ee to Timucua i. Tawasa w corresponds to Timucua b, which was probably pronounced . Some of the following correspondences have a final t in Tawasa, which appears to be a Muskogean suffix. Others appear to have the Timucua copula -la. Timucua forms are Mocama dialect.

Correspondences with Muskogean and Timucua are,

Although ássick 'moon' appears to be an Alabama form, its compounds are Timucuan:

Notes

References 

 
 
 

Timucua language
Indigenous languages of the North American Southeast
Extinct languages of North America
Native American history of Alabama
Native American history of Florida
Languages extinct in the 18th century